The Caucasian race (also Caucasoid or Europid, Europoid) is an obsolete racial classification of human beings based on a now-disproven theory of biological race. The Caucasian race was historically regarded as a biological taxon which, depending on which of the historical race classifications was being used, usually included ancient and modern populations from all or parts of Europe, Western Asia, Central Asia, South Asia, North Africa, and the Horn of Africa.

First introduced in the 1780s by members of the Göttingen school of history, the term denoted one of three purported major races of humankind (those three being Caucasoid, Mongoloid, and Negroid). In biological anthropology, Caucasoid has been used as an umbrella term for phenotypically similar groups from these different regions, with a focus on skeletal anatomy, and especially cranial morphology, without regard to skin tone. Ancient and modern "Caucasoid" populations were thus not exclusively "white", but ranged in complexion from white-skinned to dark brown.

Since the second half of the 20th century, physical anthropologists have switched from a typological understanding of human biological diversity towards a genomic and population-based perspective, and have tended to understand race as a social classification of humans based on phenotype and ancestry as well as cultural factors, as the concept is also understood in the social sciences.

In the United States, the root term Caucasian is still in use as a synonym for white or of European, Middle Eastern, or North African ancestry, a usage that has been criticized.

History of the concept

The Caucasus as the origin of humanity and the peak of beauty
In the eighteenth century, the prevalent view among European scholars was that the human species had its origin in the region of the Caucasus Mountains. This view was based upon the Caucasus being the location for the purported landing point of Noah's Ark – from whom the Bible states that humanity is descended – and the location for the suffering of Prometheus, who in Hesiod's myth had crafted humankind from clay.

In addition, the most beautiful humans were reputed by Europeans to be the stereotypical "Circassian beauties" and the Georgian people; both Georgia and Circassia are in the Caucasus region. The "Circassian beauty" stereotype had its roots in the Middle Ages, while the reputation for the attractiveness of the Georgian people was developed by early modern travellers to the region such as Jean Chardin.

Göttingen School of History

The term Caucasian as a racial category was first introduced in the 1780s by members of the Göttingen School of History – notably Christoph Meiners in 1785 and Johann Friedrich Blumenbach in 1795—it had originally referred in a narrow sense to the native inhabitants of the Caucasus region.

In his The Outline of History of Mankind (1785), the German philosopher Christoph Meiners first used the concept of a "Caucasian" (Kaukasisch) race in its wider racial sense. Meiners' term was given wider circulation in the 1790s by many people. Meiners imagined that the Caucasian race encompassed all of the ancient and most of the modern native populations of Europe, the aboriginal inhabitants of West Asia (including the Phoenicians, Hebrews and Arabs), the autochthones of Northern Africa (Berbers, Egyptians, Abyssinians and neighboring groups), the Indians, and the ancient Guanches.

It was Johann Friedrich Blumenbach, a colleague of Meiners', who later came to be considered one of the founders of the discipline of anthropology, who gave the term a wider audience, by grounding it in the new methods of craniometry and Linnean taxonomy. Blumenbach did not credit Meiners with his taxonomy, although his justification clearly points to Meiners' aesthetic viewpoint of Caucasus origins. In contrast to Meiners, however, Blumenbach was a monogenist—he considered all humans to have a shared origin and to be a single species. Blumenbach, like Meiners, did rank his Caucasian grouping higher than other groups in terms of mental faculties or potential for achievement despite pointing out that the transition from one race to another is so gradual that the distinctions between the races presented by him are "very arbitrary".

Alongside the anthropologist Georges Cuvier, Blumenbach classified the Caucasian race by cranial measurements and bone morphology in addition to skin pigmentation. Following Meiners, Blumenbach described the Caucasian race as consisting of the native inhabitants of Europe, West Asia, the Indian peninsula, and North Africa. This usage later grew into the widely used color terminology for race, contrasting with the terms Negroid, Mongoloid, and Australoid.

Carleton Coon
There was never consensus among the proponents of the "Caucasoid race" concept regarding how it would be delineated from other groups such as the proposed Mongoloid race. Carleton S. Coon (1939) included the populations native to all of Central and Northern Asia, including the Ainu people, under the Caucasoid label. However, many scientists maintained the racial categorizations of color established by Meiners' and Blumenbach's works, along with many other early steps of anthropology, well into the late 19th and mid-to-late 20th centuries, increasingly used to justify political policies, such as segregation and immigration restrictions, and other opinions based in prejudice. For example, Thomas Henry Huxley (1870) classified all populations of Asian nations as Mongoloid. Lothrop Stoddard (1920) in turn classified as "brown" most of the populations of the Middle East, North Africa, the Horn of Africa, Central Asia and South Asia. He counted as "white" only European peoples and their descendants, as well as a few populations in areas adjacent to or opposite southern Europe, in parts of Anatolia and parts of the Rif and Atlas mountains.

In 1939, Coon argued that the Caucasian race had originated through admixture between Homo neanderthalensis and Homo sapiens of the "Mediterranean type" which he considered to be distinct from Caucasians, rather than a subtype of it as others had done. While Blumenbach had erroneously thought that light skin color was ancestral to all humans and the dark skin of southern populations was due to sun, Coon thought that Caucasians had lost their original pigmentation as they moved North. Coon used the term "Caucasoid" and "White race" synonymously.

In 1962, Coon published The Origin of Races, wherein he proposed a polygenist view, that human races had evolved separately from local varieties of Homo erectus. Dividing humans into five main races, and argued that each evolved in parallel but at different rates, so that some races had reached higher levels of evolution than others. He argued that the Caucasoid race had evolved 200,000 years prior to the "Congoid race", and hence represented a higher evolutionary stage.

Coon argued that Caucasoid traits emerged prior to the Cro-Magnons, and were present in the Skhul and Qafzeh hominids. However, these fossils and the Predmost specimen were held to be Neanderthaloid derivatives because they possessed short cervical vertebrae, lower and narrower pelves, and had some Neanderthal skull traits. Coon further asserted that the Caucasoid race was of dual origin, consisting of early dolichocephalic (e.g. Galley Hill, Combe-Capelle, Téviec) and Neolithic Mediterranean Homo sapiens (e.g. Muge, Long Barrow, Corded), as well as Neanderthal-influenced brachycephalic Homo sapiens dating to the Mesolithic and Neolithic (e.g. Afalou, Hvellinge, Fjelkinge).

Coon's theories on race were much disputed in his lifetime, and are considered pseudoscientific in modern anthropology.

Criticism based on modern genetics 

After discussing various criteria used in biology to define subspecies or races, Alan R. Templeton concludes in 2016: "[T]he answer to the question whether races exist in humans is clear and unambiguous: no."

Racial anthropology

Physical traits

Skull and teeth
Drawing from Petrus Camper's theory of facial angle, Blumenbach and Cuvier classified races, through their skull collections based on their cranial features and anthropometric measurements. Caucasoid traits were recognised as: thin nasal aperture ("nose narrow"), a small mouth, facial angle of 100–90°, and orthognathism, exemplified by what Blumenbach saw in most ancient Greek crania and statues. Later anthropologists of the 19th and early 20th century such as James Cowles Prichard, Charles Pickering, Broca, Paul Topinard, Samuel George Morton, Oscar Peschel, Charles Gabriel Seligman, Robert Bennett Bean, William Zebina Ripley, Alfred Cort Haddon and Roland Dixon came to recognize other Caucasoid morphological features, such as prominent supraorbital ridges and a sharp nasal sill. Many anthropologists in the 20th century used the term "Caucasoid" in their literature, such as William Clouser Boyd, Reginald Ruggles Gates, Carleton S. Coon, Sonia Mary Cole, Alice Mossie Brues and Grover Krantz replacing the earlier term "Caucasian" as it had fallen out of usage.

Classification

In the 19th century Meyers Konversations-Lexikon (1885–1890), Caucasoid was one of the three great races of humankind, alongside Mongoloid and Negroid. The taxon was taken to consist of a number of subtypes. The Caucasoid peoples were usually divided into three groups on ethnolinguistic grounds, termed Aryan (Indo-European), Semitic (Semitic languages), and Hamitic (Hamitic languages i.e. Berber-Cushitic-Egyptian).

19th century classifications of the peoples of India were initially uncertain if the Dravidians and the Sinahalese were Caucasoid or a separate Dravida race, but by and in the 20th century, anthropologists predominantly declared Dravidians to be Caucasoid.

Historically, the racial classification of the Turkic peoples was sometimes given as "Turanid". Turanid racial type or "minor race", subtype of the Europid (Caucasian) race with Mongoloid admixtures, situated at the boundary of the distribution of the Mongoloid and Europid "great races".

There was no universal consensus of the validity of the "Caucasoid" grouping within those who attempted to categorize human variation. Thomas Henry Huxley in 1870 wrote that the "absurd denomination of 'Caucasian was in fact a conflation of his Xanthochroi (Nordic) and Melanochroi (Mediterranean) types.

Subraces
The postulated subraces vary depending on the author, including but not limited to Mediterranean, Atlantid, Nordic, East Baltic, Alpine, Dinaric, Turanid, Armenoid, Iranid, Indid, Arabid, and Hamitic.

H.G. Wells argued that across Europe, North Africa, the Horn of Africa, West Asia, Central Asia and South Asia, a Caucasian physical stock existed. He divided this racial element into two main groups: a shorter and darker Mediterranean or Iberian race and a taller and lighter Nordic race. Wells asserted that Semitic and Hamitic populations were mainly of Mediterranean type, and Aryan populations were originally of Nordic type. He regarded the Basques as descendants of early Mediterranean peoples, who inhabited western Europe before the arrival of Aryan Celts from the direction of central Europe.

The "Northcaucasian race" is a sub-race proposed by Carleton S. Coon (1930). It comprises the native populations of the North Caucasus, the Balkars, Karachays and Vainakh (Chechens and Ingushs).

An introduction to anthropology, published in 1953, gives a more complex classification scheme:
 "Archaic Caucasoid Races": Ainu people in Japan, Australoid race, Dravidian peoples, and Vedda
 "Primary Caucasoid Races": Alpine race, Armenoid race, Mediterranean race, and Nordic race
 "Secondary or Derived Caucasoid Races": Dinaric race, East Baltic race, and Polynesian race

Usage in the United States

Besides its use in anthropology and related fields, the term "Caucasian" has often been used in the United States in a different, social context to describe a group commonly called "white people". "White" also appears as a self-reporting entry in the U.S. Census. Naturalization as a United States citizen was restricted to "free white persons" by the Naturalization Act of 1790, and later extended to other resident populations by the Naturalization Act of 1870, Indian Citizenship Act of 1924 and Immigration and Nationality Act of 1952. The Supreme Court in United States v. Bhagat Singh Thind (1923) decided that Asian Indians were ineligible for citizenship because, though deemed "Caucasian" anthropologically, they were not white like European descendants since most laypeople did not consider them to be "white" people. This represented a change from the Supreme Court's earlier opinion in Ozawa v. United States, in which it had expressly approved of two lower court cases holding "high caste Hindus" to be "free white persons" within the meaning of the naturalization act. Government lawyers later recognized that the Supreme Court had "withdrawn" this approval in Thind. In 1946, the U.S. Congress passed a new law establishing a small immigration quota for Indians, which also permitted them to become citizens. Major changes to immigration law, however, only later came in 1965, when many earlier racial restrictions on immigration were lifted. This resulted in confusion about whether American Hispanics are included as "white", as the term Hispanic originally applied to Spanish heritage but has since expanded to include all people with origins in Spanish speaking countries. In other countries, the term Hispanic is rarely used.

The United States National Library of Medicine often used the term "Caucasian" as a race in the past. However, it later discontinued such usage in favor of the more narrow geographical term European, which traditionally only applied to a subset of Caucasoids.

See also
 Race (human categorization)
 Race and genetics
 Anthropometry
 Leucism
 Race and ethnicity in the United States Census

Notes

References

Bibliography

Literature
 
 
 Blumenbach, Johann Friedrich (1775) On the Natural Varieties of Mankind – the book that introduced the concept
 
  – a history of the pseudoscience of race, skull measurements, and IQ inheritability
 
  – a major reference of modern population genetics
 
 

Historical definitions of race
Biological anthropology
Pseudoscience